McHenry is a city in McHenry County, Illinois, United States. It is a suburb, part of the Chicago metropolitan area and is located about 37 miles northwest of Chicago. Per the 2020 census, the population was 27,135. McHenry was at one time the county seat of McHenry County, which once included adjoining Lake County to the east. McHenry took its name from the county, which was named for Major William McHenry, a prominent US Army officer in the Black Hawk War.

It rests at an elevation of 797 feet and the Fox River flows through the eastern portion of the city. It is surrounded by natural lakes and streams, grassy moraine hills, gravel banks and shallow nutrient-rich peat bogs, remnants of receding glaciers from the last ice age. Moraine Hills State Park and Volo Bog State Natural Area preserve some of these natural features.

History

19th century 
In the 1830s various settlers arrived in the area and created the foundation for McHenry. Some of the family names can still be seen today: McCullom, McLean, Boone, and Wheeler.

George Gage came to the area in 1835 and purchased a plot of land west of the Fox River. This area eventually came to be known as Gagetown. In 1854, George Gage played an instrumental role in bringing the railroad to the city. Gagetown was eventually renamed to West McHenry.

In 1851, a dam was built on Boone Creek which created Mill Pond. The pond encompassed an area between today's rail road tracks and Route 31 and north of Waukegan Road.

In 1860, the historical Count's House was completed.

On August 4, 1875, the first issue of the city newspaper, the McHenry Plaindealer, was published by Jay Van Slyke.

In 1880, the first bridge in McHenry was built at Pearl Street.

20th century 

On March 30, 1908 a train bound for Ringwood crashed near the McHenry train depot. One person was killed.

In 1929, Mill Pond was drained by removing the dam on Boone Creek.

The original Pearl Street bridge was dismantled in 1976 and rebuilt using concrete. The bridge was split into multiple parts and relocated. One part sits on the grounds of TC Industries in Crystal Lake. Another sits in a county storage unit.

In 1985, the McHenry Plaindealer became part of the Northwest Herald.

Geography
McHenry is located 50 miles northwest of Chicago in northeastern Illinois on the Fox River. McHenry lies within the Fox River Valley, and its downtown area is situated on that river which is how it earned the nickname "The Heart of the Fox River".

Climate and weather
Typically climate and weather in McHenry year-round is similar to Chicago's, though sometimes it is warmer in summer, and colder in winter.

Government

The city of McHenry lies within two townships: McHenry Township and Nunda Township. The majority of the city falls within the former.

Mayor
See the full article, List of mayors of McHenry, Illinois.

 Wayne Jett

City Council
The city council consists of representatives from the 7 city wards:
 Ward 1 - Victor A. Santi
 Ward 2 - Andrew Glab
 Ward 3 - Frank McClatchey
 Ward 4 - Ryan Harding
 Ward 5 - Shawn Strach
 Ward 6 - Patrick Devine
 Ward 7 - Sue Miller

City Clerk
Trisha Ramel is the City Clerk and is supported by the Deputy City Clerk, Monte Johnson.

City Administrator 

 Derik Morefield

Police Chief 

 John Birk

Demographics

2020 census

2000 Census
The racial makeup of the city was 94.18% White, 0.35% African American, 0.21% Native American, 0.89% Asian, 0.04% Pacific Islander, 3.31% from other races, and 1.02% from two or more races. Hispanic or Latino people of any race were 7.10% of the population.

There were 7,872 households, of which 38.7% had children under the age of 18 living with them, 57.2% were married couples living together, 9.7% had a female householder with no husband present, and 29.4% were non-families. 24.7% of all households were made up of individuals, and 9.9% had someone living alone who was 65 years of age or older. The average household size was 2.70 and the average family size was 3.25.

Age distribution was 28.5% under the age of 18, 7.8% from 18 to 24, 32.7% from 25 to 44, 19.9% from 45 to 64, and 11.0% who were 65 years of age or older. The median age was 34 years. For every 100 females, there were 94.8 males. For every 100 females age 18 and over, there were 91.2 males.

The median household income was $55,759, and the median family income was $66,040. Males had a median income of $46,552 versus $29,808 for females. The per capita income for the city was $23,272. About 3.8% of families and 4.6% of the population were below the poverty line, including 6.1% of those under age 18 and 2.6% of those age 65 or over.

Culture
McHenry is home to Fiesta Days, a ten-day festival in the middle of the summer that includes music, parades, food, car shows, and more.

Historic Places on the National Register

Recreation
McHenry is home to Moraine Hills State Park which has many miles of hiking trails and connects to the Stratton Lock and Dam. Fishing from the dam is allowed only with a valid fishing license.

In addition to several dozen city parks, the Prairie Trail — a sub-section of the larger Grand Illinois Trail — runs through the middle of the city.

There once was a movie theater downtown but it was closed in 2014. In 2017 it was announced that it would be renovated in late 2017. The new McHenry Downtown Theater reopened on January 18, 2018. A drive-in theater east of town is open during the summer months.

Economy
Major industrial users including Medela, Follett School Solutions, Fabrik Industries, and Plaspros have located in the city's business parks. Northwestern Centegra Hospital - McHenry provides emergency and in and out-patient health care services to the city and surrounding areas. Steady residential growth has resulted in significant commercial development. The north Richmond Road corridor has become a destination for shoppers in the northern Illinois and southern Wisconsin areas with numerous "big box" retailers and smaller chains.

Downtown McHenry is home to the one mile (1.6 km) McHenry Riverwalk District which runs along Boone Creek and the Fox River. It is home to residences, shops, a movie theater, restaurants, bars and other various forms of entertainment and commerce. It is broken up into three zones, the "Historic Zone", "Residential Zone (Phase 1)" and "Commercial Zone".

Education

Schools and libraries 
There are two school districts serving the city of McHenry: McHenry Community High School District 156 and McHenry School District 15. District 156 oversees two high schools while District 15 oversees five elementary schools and three middle schools.

McHenry is served by one public library which is part of Cooperative Computer Services (CCS) consortium. The library itself houses physical books, DVDs, magazines, and more as well as providing access to online digital content. The library also offers various training classes on various topics and has several meeting rooms available for use by request.

Colleges 
In addition to K-12 schools, McHenry County College holds business seminars and trainings in the Shah Center.

Transportation

Airports
The closest public international airports to the city of McHenry are Chicago's O'Hare International Airport and Milwaukee Mitchell International Airport in Milwaukee.

The closest private airport to the city is Galt Airport in Wonderlake.

Public transportation
The city of McHenry is served by Pace Bus and connects travellers to other cities in the area.

Bike
The Prairie Trail runs through the middle of McHenry from Crystal Lake and connects to trails near the border of Wisconsin.

Passenger rail

McHenry is currently the terminus of a branch line on Metra's Union Pacific Northwest Line, with weekday passenger service to Ogilvie Transportation Center (formerly Northwestern Station) in downtown Chicago. The line that now terminates at McHenry once continued to Williams Bay, Wisconsin, but that service was discontinued in stages in the 1960s and 1970s.

Road
Illinois Route 31 and Illinois Route 120 intersect in the city center. While not highways or interstates, they are the main roads into and out of the city.

Notable people 

 Gary Adams (d. 2000), founded TaylorMade Golf in McHenry in 1979
 Pamela Althoff (b. 1953), member of the Illinois Senate from 2003-2018. She was Mayor of McHenry prior to her appointment to the Illinois Senate.
 Thomas A. Bolger (1887–1953), member of the Illinois House of Representatives
 John Brzenk (b. 1964), world champion arm wrestler
 Rob Doran (b. 1976), original bassist of the rock band Alkaline Trio
 Jason Faunt (b. 1974), actor, grew up in McHenry
 Flavel K. Granger (1832–1905), Illinois state legislator, lawyer, and farmer; lived in McHenry
 Mariann Mayberry (b. 1965), member of Steppenwolf Theatre Company, lived in McHenry and graduated from McHenry High School (West Campus)
 Jace Sayler (b. 1979), football player with the New England Patriots (Super Bowl champion), attended McHenry High School (West Campus)
 Matt Skiba (b. 1976), Grammy-nominated co-lead singer and guitarist for the rock bands Blink-182 and Alkaline Trio
 Robert Tonyan (b. 1994), professional American football player for the Green Bay Packers
 Joe Walsh (b. 1961), radio personality and former congressman (Republican) for the 8th district
 Craig Wilcox (b. 1967), member of the Illinois Senate since 2018. He resides in McHenry.
Lana Rhoades (b. 1996), world famous social-media/pornography star. Born and raised in McHenry
 Jack Perconte (b. 1954), MLB Baseball Player for Dodgers, Indians, Mariners

Notable horses 
 Two Eyed Jack, born in McHenry; Quarter Horse stallion and showhorse; the leading all time sire of American Quarter Horse Association (AQHA) champions

References

External links
 
 McHenry Public Library District
 

 
Chicago metropolitan area
Cities in Illinois
Cities in McHenry County, Illinois